Kanij is a village in Mehmedabad Taluka in Kheda District of Gujarat State, India. It is about 37m above sea level. Kanij is located 15 km towards the north from district headquarters Kheda. The primary language spoken is Gujarati. 15 km from Ahmedabad. 47 km from the state capital Gandhinagar.

Nenpur (4 km), Malutaj (5 km), Raska (5 km), Sankhej (6 km), Lali (6 km) are villages nearby. Kanij is surrounded by Kheda Taluka towards the east, Matar Taluka towards the south, Daskroi Taluka towards then west, and Ahmadabad Taluka up north.

Mehmedabad, Kheda, Ahmedabad, and Nadiad are the nearby cities to Kanij.

Villages in Kheda district